In differential geometry, the sharp map is the mapping that converts 1-forms into corresponding vectors, given a non-degenerate (0,2)-tensor.

Definition 
Let  be a manifold and  denote the space of all sections of its tangent bundle. Fix a nondegenerate (0,2)-tensor field  , for example a metric tensor or a symplectic form. The definition

yields a linear map sometimes called the flat map

which is an isomorphism, since  is non-degenerate. Its inverse

is called the sharp map.

See also
Flat map

Differential topology
Differential geometry